The 1983 New Hampshire Wildcats football team was an American football team that represented the University of New Hampshire as a member of the Yankee Conference during the 1983 NCAA Division I-AA football season. In its twelfth year under head coach Bill Bowes, the team compiled a 7–3 record (3–2 against conference opponents) and finished third out of six teams in the Yankee Conference.

Schedule

References

New Hampshire
New Hampshire Wildcats football seasons
New Hampshire Wildcats football